Bagshawe Glacier is a glacier which drains the northeast slopes of Mount Theodore and discharges into Lester Cove, Andvord Bay west of Mount Tsotsorkov, on the west coast of Graham Land, Antarctica.

History
The mouth of the glacier was first seen and sketched by the Belgian Antarctic Expedition in February 1898, and the glacier was first roughly surveyed by Kenneth V. Blaiklock of the Falkland Islands Dependencies Survey from the ship  in April 1955. It was named by the UK Antarctic Place-Names Committee after Thomas W. Bagshawe who, with Maxime C. Lester, wintered at Waterboat Point near Andvord Bay in 1921.

See also
 List of glaciers in the Antarctic
 Glaciology

References

Glaciers of Danco Coast